Danielle Boyd (born May 30, 1990 in Kingston, Ontario) is a Canadian sailor. Along with partner Erin Rafuse, Boyd finished in sixth place at the 2015 Pan American Games in the 49erFX. Rafuse and Boyd also qualified to compete at the 2016 Summer Olympics, finishing 16th.

References

External links
Official website

Living people
Pan American Games competitors for Canada
1990 births
Sportspeople from Kingston, Ontario
Sailors at the 2016 Summer Olympics – 49er FX
Canadian female sailors (sport)
Olympic sailors of Canada
Sailors at the 2015 Pan American Games